Perth North was a federal electoral district represented in the House of Commons of Canada from 1867 to 1935. It was located in the province of Ontario.  It was created by the British North America Act of 1867 which divided the County of Perth into two ridings.

The North Riding of the County of Perth consisted of the Townships of Wallace, Elma, Logan, Ellice, Mornington, and North Easthope, and the Town of Stratford.

In 1882, it was redefined to consist of the townships of Ellice, Elma, Mornington and Logan, the towns of Stratford and Listowel, and the village of Milverton. In 1903, it was redefined to include the township of Easthope North. In 1914, it was redefined to include the township of Wallace, and exclude the township of Logan.

In 1924, Perth North was defined to consist of the part of the county of Perth lying north of and including the township of Easthope North, the city of Stratford, and the townships of Ellice and Elma.

The electoral district was abolished in 1933 when it was merged into Perth riding.

Members of Parliament

* denotes byelection

Electoral history 

|- 
  
|Liberal
|James Redford  
|align="right"| 1,515   
  
|Liberal-Conservative
|Thomas Mayne Daly, Sr.
|align="right"| 1,307    
|}

|- 
  
|Liberal-Conservative
|Thomas Mayne Daly, Sr. 
|align="right"| 1,848    
  
|Liberal
|James Redford  
|align="right"| 1,792   
|}

|- 
  
|Conservative
|Andrew Monteith 
|align="right"| 1,992    
  
|Liberal
|James Redford  
|align="right"| 1,829   
|}

|- 
  
|Conservative
|Andrew Monteith 
|align="right"| 1,737    
 
|Independent
|James Fisher
|align="right"|1,717   
|}

|- 
  
|Conservative
|Samuel Rollin Hesson 
|align="right"| 2,533    
 
|Independent
|J. Fisher
|align="right"| 2,450   
|}

|- 
  
|Conservative
|Samuel Rollin Hesson 
|align="right"| 1,934    
 
|Independent
|Robert Jones
|align="right"| 1,682   
|}

|- 
  
|Conservative
|Samuel Rollin Hesson 
|align="right"| 2,382    
  
|Liberal
|James Johnson
|align="right"| 2,182   
|}

|- 
  
|Liberal
|James Nicol Grieve 
|align="right"|  2,520   
  
|Conservative
|Samuel Rollin Hesson 
|align="right"|2,449    
|}

|- 
  
|Liberal
|GRIEVE, James Nicol 
|align="right"| acclaimed   
|}

|- 
  
|Conservative
|MACLAREN, Alex. F. 
|align="right"| 2,916    
  
|Liberal
|GRIEVE, James N.
|align="right"| 2,870   
|}

|- 
  
|Conservative
|MACLAREN, A.F. 
|align="right"|  3,118    
  
|Liberal
|GOETZ, George 
|align="right"|2,838   
|}

|- 
  
|Conservative
|MACLAREN, Alexander Ferguson
|align="right"|  3,618    
  
|Liberal
|MABEE, James P.
|align="right"|3,298   
|}

|- 
  
|Liberal
|RANKIN, James Palmer 
|align="right"| 3,514   
  
|Conservative
|MACLAREN, Alexander Ferguson 
|align="right"| 3,473    
|}

|- 
  
|Conservative
|MORPHY, Hugh Boulton 
|align="right"|  3,741    
  
|Liberal
|RANKIN, James Palmer 
|align="right"| 3,244   
|}

|- 
  
|Government
|MORPHY, Hugh Boulton 
|align="right"| 5,977   
  
|Opposition
|RANKIN, James Palmer 
|align="right"| 4,109   
|}

|- 
  
|Liberal
|RANKIN, James Palmer 
|align="right"|6,030   
  
|Conservative
|MORPHY, Hugh Boulton
|align="right"| 5,274    

|}

|- 
  
|Conservative
|WRIGHT, David McKenzie  
|align="right"| 7,386    
  
|Liberal
|BROWN, Tom 
|align="right"| 6,725   
|}

|- 
  
|Liberal
|HAY, Francis Wellington
|align="right"|8,236   
  
|Conservative
|WRIGHT, David McKenzie 
|align="right"|7,596    
|}

|- 
  
|Conservative
|WRIGHT, David M.  
|align="right"| 8,726    
  
|Liberal
|SMITH, David 
|align="right"| 7,850   
|}

See also 

 List of Canadian federal electoral districts
 Past Canadian electoral districts

External links 

 Website of the Parliament of Canada

Former federal electoral districts of Ontario